José Antonio Hernández Cruz (born February 16, 1995 in Tepic, Nayarit) is a professional Mexican footballer who currently plays for Deportivo Tepic F.C.'s B squad.

References

1995 births
Living people
Mexican footballers
People from Tepic

Association footballers not categorized by position
21st-century Mexican people